Franz Kohaut (died 1822) was a Czech botanical collector and gardener from Neuhaus, Bohemia.

In 1816–18 he accompanied botanist Franz Wilhelm Sieber (1789–1844) on an expedition to Crete, Egypt and Palestine, and afterwards worked for Sieber as a botanical collector in Martinique (1819–21). Specimens from Martinique were later distributed as Herbarium Martinicense. Kohaut died in 1822 while on an expedition in Senegal.

The plant genus "Kohautia" from the family Rubiaceae is named in his honor, as well as the species "Tetrapteris kohauti" Sieber ex Presl (Malpighiaceae) and  "Cestrum kohauti" Bercht. & J.Presl (Solanaceae).

References 
 Aluka (Kohaut, Franz)

19th-century Austrian botanists
Botanists active in the Caribbean
Austrian people of Czech descent
Year of birth missing
1822 deaths